Root vegetables are underground plant parts eaten by humans as food. Although botany distinguishes true roots (such as taproots and tuberous roots) from non-roots (such as bulbs, corms, rhizomes, and tubers, although some contain both hypocotyl and taproot tissue), the term "root vegetable" is applied to all these types in agricultural and culinary usage (see terminology of vegetables).

Root vegetables are generally storage organs, enlarged to store energy in the form of carbohydrates. They differ in the concentration and the balance among starches, sugars, and other types of carbohydrate. Of particular economic importance are those with a high carbohydrate concentration in the form of starch; starchy root vegetables are important staple foods, particularly in tropical regions, overshadowing cereals throughout much of Central Africa, West Africa and Oceania, where they are used directly or mashed to make foods such as fufu or poi.

Many root vegetables keep well in root cellars, lasting several months. This is one way of storing food for use long after harvest, which is especially important in nontropical latitudes, where winter is traditionally a time of little to no harvesting. There are also season extension methods that can extend the harvest throughout the winter, mostly through the use of polytunnels.

List of root vegetables
The following list classifies root vegetables organized by their roots' anatomy.

Modified plant stem 

 Corm
Amorphophallus konjac (konjac)
 Colocasia esculenta (taro)
 Eleocharis dulcis (Chinese water chestnut)
 Ensete spp. (enset)
 Nymphaea spp. (waterlily)
 Pteridium esculentum
 Sagittaria spp. (arrowhead or wapatoo)
 Typha spp.
 Xanthosoma spp. (malanga, cocoyam, tannia, yautia and other names)
 Colocasia antiquorum (eddoe or Japanese potato)

 Bulb
 Allium cepa (onion)
 Allium sativum (garlic)
 Camassia quamash (blue camas)
 Foeniculum vulgare (fennel)
 Rhizome
 Curcuma longa (turmeric)
 Panax ginseng (ginseng)
 Arthropodium spp. (rengarenga, vanilla lily, and others)
 Canna spp. (canna)
 Cordyline fruticosa (ti)
 Maranta arundinacea (arrowroot)
 Nelumbo nucifera (lotus root)
 Typha spp. (cattail or bulrush)
 Zingiber officinale (ginger, galangal)

 Tuberous stem
 Apios americana (hog potato or groundnut)
 Cyperus esculentus (tigernut or chufa)
 Helianthus tuberosus (Jerusalem artichoke or sunchoke)
 Hemerocallis spp. (daylily)
 Lathyrus tuberosus (earthnut pea)
 Oxalis tuberosa (oca or New Zealand yam)
 Plectranthus edulis and P. esculentus (kembili, dazo, and others)
 Solanum tuberosum (potato)
 Stachys affinis (Chinese artichoke or crosne)
 Tropaeolum tuberosum (mashua or añu)
 Ullucus tuberosus (ulluku)

 Root-like stem Zamia integrifolia (Florida arrowroot)

 True root 

 Taproot (some types may incorporate substantial hypocotyl tissue)
  Arracacia xanthorrhiza (arracacha)
 Beta vulgaris (beet and mangelwurzel)
 Brassica spp. (kohlrabi, rutabaga and turnip)
 Bunium persicum (black cumin)
 Burdock (Arctium, family Asteraceae)
 Carrot (Daucus carota subsp. sativus)
 Celeriac (Apium graveolens rapaceum)
 Daikon – the large East Asian white radish (Raphanus sativus var. longipinnatus)
 Dandelion (Taraxacum) spp.
 Lepidium meyenii (maca)
 Microseris lanceolata (murnong or yam daisy)
 Pachyrhizus spp. (jicama and ahipa)
 Parsnip (Pastinaca sativa)
 Petroselinum spp. (parsley root)
 Radish (Raphanus sativus)
 Scorzonera hispanica (black salsify)
 Sium sisarum (skirret)
 Tragopogon spp. (salsify)
 Vigna lanceolata (bush carrot or bush potato)

 Tuberous root
 Amorphophallus galbra (yellow lily yam)
 Conopodium majus (pignut or earthnut)
 Dioscorea spp. (yams, ube)
 Dioscorea polystachya (nagaimo, Chinese yam, Korean yam, mountain yam, white ñame)
 Hornstedtia scottiana (native ginger)
 Ipomoea batatas (sweet potato)
 Ipomoea costata (desert yam)
 Manihot esculenta (cassava or yuca or manioc)
 Mirabilis expansa (mauka or chago)
 Psoralea esculenta (breadroot, tipsin, or prairie turnip)
 Smallanthus sonchifolius'' (yacón)

References

External links 

 

'
'vegetables, root
vegetables, root